James Nicholas Scully (born April 19, 1992) is an American actor, best known for portraying JD in the Paramount Network series Heathers (2018) and Forty Quinn in the Netflix thriller series You.

Early life
Scully was born and raised in San Antonio, Texas. He attended Driscoll Middle School and LEE High School's North East School of the Arts (Class of 2010), both of which are in North East Independent School District. In his youth, he spent a brief period in England when his father was stationed there as a part of the United States Air Force.

He later attended Otterbein University, where he earned a Bachelor of Fine Arts in musical theater. Scully was also a cycling instructor for three and a half years at SWERVE Fitness.

Career 
Prior to working in Los Angeles, Scully resided in New York performing Off-Broadway.

In 2016, Scully made his acting debut in the web series drama series, Sublets. Following on from his first role, Scully later made appearances in television series, such as Quantico and 9-1-1.

He has also done commercial work for Outback Steakhouse and a public service announcement about Vicodin abuse with Riverdale actress, Camila Mendes.

In 2018, Scully starred in the main role of JD on the Paramount Network series Heathers. In January 2019, it was announced that Scully had been cast as Forty Quinn on the second season of the Netflix thriller series You. 

He also portrayed Charlie, one of the main love interests in the 2022 Hulu film Fire Island.

Personal life
Scully is gay.

Filmography

Film

Television

Video games

References

External links
 

1992 births
Living people
21st-century LGBT people
21st-century American male actors
American male television actors
American gay actors
LGBT people from Texas
Male actors from San Antonio
Otterbein University alumni